Yuhachi Ikeda (28 August 1886 – 31 March 1963) was a Japanese sculptor. His work was part of the art competitions at the 1932 Summer Olympics and the 1936 Summer Olympics.

References

1886 births
1963 deaths
20th-century Japanese sculptors
Japanese sculptors
Olympic competitors in art competitions
People from Kagawa Prefecture